Juan Ignacio Chela was the defending champion, but could not defend his title since he withdrew from the tournament for personal reasons.
Ryan Sweeting claimed the title, defeating Kei Nishikori 6–4, 7–6(7–3) in the final match.

Seeds
The top four seeds received a bye into the second round.

Draw

Finals

Top half

Bottom half

References

 Main draw
 Qualifying draw

Singles